Walk Run Cha-Cha is a 2019 American documentary short film directed by Laura Nix of The New York Times, which distributed the film.

Plot 

The film follows middle-aged Vietnamese couple Paul and Millie Cao preparing for ballroom dancing in suburban Los Angeles 40 years after their separation due to the Vietnam War.

Accolades 

 Nomination  2020: Academy Award for Best Documentary (Short Subject)

See also
Counterculture of the 1960s
Strictly Ballroom

References

External links 
 Walk, Run, Cha-Cha on the NY Times official Vimeo channel
 

2019 films
Films set in Los Angeles
American short documentary films
Ballroom dancing films
Documentary films about dance
Vietnamese-American culture in California
2019 short documentary films
2010s American films